The 26th Field Artillery Regiment, Royal Canadian Artillery, is a Canadian Army Primary Reserve artillery regiment based in Brandon and Portage la Prairie, Manitoba. 71 Field Battery, Headquarters and Service Battery, and Regimental Headquarters are in Brandon  and 13 Field Battery is in Portage la Prairie  Together with 10th Field Artillery Regiment, RCA and 116th Independent Field Battery, RCA, it forms the 38 Artillery Tactical Group within the 38 Canadian Brigade Group of 3rd Canadian Division.

Allocated batteries
13th Field Battery, RCA
71st Field Battery, RCA

Lineage

26th Field Artillery Regiment, RCA 

Originated on 1 April 1908, in Brandon, Manitoba, as the 99th Regiment.
Redesignated on 1 May 1911, as the 99th Manitoba Rangers.
Redesignated on 12 March 1920, as The Manitoba Rangers.
Amalgamated on 15 December 1936, with the 59th Field Battery, RCA, and redesignated as the 26th Field Brigade, RCA.
Redesignated on 7 November 1940, as the 26th (Reserve) Field Brigade.
Redesignated on 1 April 1943, as the 26th (Reserve) Field Regiment.
Redesignated on 1 April 1946, as the 26th Field Regiment (Self-Propelled), RCA.
Redesignated on 12 April 1960, as the 26th Field Artillery Regiment (Self-Propelled), RCA.
Redesignated on 1 November 1964, as the 26th Field Artillery Regiment, RCA.

59th Field Battery, RCA
Originated on 2 February 1920, in Portage la Prairie, Manitoba, as the 59th Battery, Canadian Field Artillery.
Redesignated on 1 July 1925, as the 59th Field Battery, CA.
Redesignated on 3 June 1935, as the 59th Field Battery, RCA.
Amalgamated on 15 December 1936, with The Manitoba Rangers.

Chart

Perpetuations

The Great War
45th Battalion (Manitoba), CEF
79th Battalion (Manitoba), CEF
181st Battalion (Brandon), CEF

Operational history
During the Great War, details from the 99th Manitoba Rangers were placed on active service on 6 August 1914 for local protection duties.

The 45th Battalion (Manitoba) CEF, was authorized on 7 November 1914 and embarked for Britain on 1 April 1916. The battalion provided reinforcements to the Canadian Corps in the field until it was absorbed by the 11th Reserve Battalion, CEF on 7 July 1916. The battalion was disbanded on 17 July 1917.

The 79th Battalion (Manitoba) CEF, was authorized on 10 July 1915 and embarked for Britain on 24 April 1916 where the battalion provided reinforcements to the Canadian Corps in the field until it was absorbed by the 17th Reserve Battalion, CEF, on 12 July 1916. The battalion was disbanded on 12 October 1917.

The 181st Battalion (Brandon) CEF, was authorized on 15 July 1916 and embarked for Britain on 18 April 1917 where its personnel were absorbed by the 18th Reserve Battalion, CEF, on 30 April 1917 to provide reinforcements for the Canadian Corps in the field. The battalion was disbanded on 17 July 1917.

26th Field Artillery Regiment, Royal Canadian Artillery, Museum 

The museum collects, preserves, researches and exhibits articles of military interest, primarily from the Western Manitoba area. The museum is affiliated with: CMA,  CHIN, OMMC and Virtual Museum of Canada.

See also 

 Organization of Military Museums of Canada
 Military history of Canada
 History of the Canadian Army
 Canadian Forces
 List of armouries in Canada

References

External links
26th Field Artillery Regiment, RCA
Royal Regiment of Canadian Artillery, 26th Field Regiment
XII Manitoba Dragoons and 26 Field Regiment Museum

Order of precedence

Field artillery regiments of Canada
Brandon, Manitoba
Regimental museums in Canada
Portage la Prairie
Military units and formations of Manitoba
1908 establishments in Manitoba